Lymantor is a genus of beetles belonging to the family Curculionidae.

The species of this genus are found in Europe and Northern America.

Species:
 Lymantor alaskanus Wood, 1978b 
 Lymantor decipiens Wood & Bright, 1992

References

Curculionidae
Curculionidae genera